Carol Mintum Barker (born 16 February 1938) is an English artist-designer, author and illustrator who is notable for her poster designs, postage stamps and book illustrations, many of them for children.

Life and career 
Barker is the daughter of British artist John Rowland Barker. As a child she was evacuated to New York during World War II, but returned to Britain and attended Bournemouth College of Art whilst also studying privately at her father's studio. She went on to study painting at Chelsea Polytechnic and illustration at the Central School of Arts and Crafts under the tutelage of Laurence Scarfe, Merlyn Evans and Raymond Roberts.

Barker became a freelance illustrator in 1958. She was married and had two sons.

Her entry in the Dictionary of British Book Illustrators states "Her work, in pen and ink, watercolour, collage and wax, is decorative rather than spatial in character."

As a book illustrator, Barker collaborated with many authors including John Cunliffe, Spike Milligan and H. E. Bates who wrote the prose for his children's book Achilles the Donkey around her pictures. So integral were her illustrations that in some instances she was given equal billing as a co-author on the book jackets. This can be seen on the covers of Spike Milligan's A Bald Twit Lion and H. E. Bates Achilles the Donkey series amongst others. She would go on to be nominated twice for the Kate Greenaway medal.

As a graphic artist, Barker is known to have designed posters and artwork for London Transport and posters and stamps for the Post Office. Her poster "Children's London" was praised by Modern Publicity magazine in 1974 as one of the best British posters of the previous year. Examples of her work can be found in the collections of the British Council, London Transport Museum, The Postal Museum and The Science Museum.

Selected awards

Selected exhibitions 

 1988: (November) Barker's work was exhibited at the Barbican Centre in London. It featured illustrations, drawings and photographs of her visit to a refugee camp in Peshawar, Pakistan and to the drought-prone Indian state of Rajasthan whilst carrying out research for her books, A Question of Refugees and A Question of Hunger.
 2017–2019: Barker's work for London Transport was selected as part of London Transport Museum's Poster Girls exhibition commemorating female graphic designers and was featured in an accompanying BBC news article.

Bibliography

Novels

Non-fiction

Illustration / graphic design

References

External links 

 Interviewed by Leslie Smith on BBC Radio in 1963
 Artist profile at London Transport Museum
 Selected works at The Postal Museum
 Entry in Illustrators of children's books, 1744–1945
 Entry with photograph in Something about the author

English children's book illustrators
20th-century English artists
Alumni of the Central School of Art and Design
Alumni of Arts University Bournemouth
1938 births
Living people
British women illustrators
Alumni of Chelsea College of Arts
20th-century English women artists